Navlakha is a residential locality within the city of Indore, Madhya Pradesh, India. The area is named after the famous Navlakha Temple in the city of Indore. Its postal code is 452012.

Overview

Navlakha is known for the Navlakh Temple and the Navlakha Bus Stand which is the origin point for many distant bus services from Indore to Jaipur, Ahmedabad, Nagpur, Pune, Shirdi, Jhansi, Gwalior, Bhopal, Jabalpur, Sagar, and Khurai among others. Navlakha is currently experiencing an increase in the rate of construction for new housing developments and multi-story buildings. Also Navlakha name is given due to presence of Nine (Nav in hindi)- Lakh(Lakha in hindi) mango trees in this area.

Shopping

Every Thursday, a weekly vegetable, fruits, and fish market is organized. It is locally known as Guruvaariya Haat (Hindi: गुरुवारिया हाट), meaning Thursday Market. Navalakha also contains a saree shop and a number of general goods stores.

Transportation

Roads
Bhanwarkuan is located on the arterial A.B. Road (NH-3). Autorickshaws, Metro Taxi, City Van, Tata Magic and various private taxis such as Uber, Meru Cabs, TaxiForSure and OlaCabs are widely available. Several City Bus routes serve the area, with fares generally ranging from ₹ 5.00 to ₹15.00. The bus routes passing through and connecting Navlakha are:

Inter-State Bus Terminus
Navlakha has a bus-stand with routes connecting Indore to mostly places in southern, south-eastern and south-western Madhya Pradesh using the roadways given below:

A.B. Road (NH-3) Mumbai, Pune.
 SH-27 Khandwa, Burhanpur, Nagpur
 NH59 Hoshangabad, Kampel and Harda

References

Suburbs of Indore
Neighbourhoods in Indore